Interactive geometry software (IGS) or dynamic geometry environments (DGEs) are computer programs which allow one to create and then manipulate geometric constructions, primarily in plane geometry. In most IGS, one starts construction by putting a few points and using them to define new objects such as lines, circles or other points. After some construction is done, one can move the points one started with and see how the construction changes.

History 

The earliest IGS was the Geometric Supposer, which was developed in the early 1980s. This was soon followed by Cabri in 1986 and The Geometer's Sketchpad.

Comparison 

There are three main types of computer environments for studying school geometry: supposers, dynamic geometry environments (DGEs) and Logo-based programs. Most are DGEs: software that allows the user to manipulate ("drag") the geometric object into different shapes or positions. The main example of a supposer is the Geometric Supposer, which does not have draggable objects, but allows students to study pre-defined shapes. Nearly all of the following programs are DGEs. For a related, comparative physical example of these algorithms, see Lenart Sphere.

License and platform 

The following table provides a first comparison of the different software according to their license and platform.

3D Software

General features 

The following table provides a more detailed comparison :

Macros 

Features related to macro constructions: (TODO)

Loci 

Loci features related to IGS: (TODO)

Proof 

We detail here the proof related features. (TODO)

Measurements and calculation 

Measurement and calculation features related to IGS: (TODO)

Graphics export formats

Object attributes

2D programs

C.a.R. 
C.a.R. is a free GPL analog of The Geometer's Sketchpad (GSP), written in Java.

Cabri 
Cabri 
Cabri was developed by the French school of mathematics education in Grenoble (Laborde, 1993)

CaRMetal 
CaRMetal is a free GPL software written in Java.  Derived from C.a.R., it provides a different user interface.

Cinderella 

Cinderella, written in Java, is very different from The Geometer's Sketchpad.  The later version Cinderella.2 also includes a physics simulation engine and a scripting language.  Also, it now supports macros, line segments, calculations, arbitrary functions, plots, etc.  Full documentation is available online.

Dr Genius 

Dr Genius was an attempt to merge Dr. Geo and the Genius calculator.

Dr. Geo 

Dr. Geo is a GPL interactive software intended for younger students (7-15).  The later version, Dr. Geo II, is a complete rewrite of Dr. Geo, for the Squeak/Smalltalk environment.

GCLC 

GCLC is a dynamic geometry tool for visualizing and teaching geometry, and for producing mathematical illustrations. In GCLC, figures are described rather than drawn. This approach stresses the fact that geometrical constructions are abstract, formal procedures and not figures. A concrete figure can be generated on the basis of the abstract description. There are several output formats, including LaTeX, LaTeX/PStricks, LaTeX/Tikz, SVG and PostScript. There is a built-in geometry theorem prover (based on the area method). GCLC is available for Windows and Linux. WinGCLC is a Windows version of GCLC with a graphical interface that provides a range of additional functionalities. GCLC is open source software (licence CC BY-ND).

GeoGebra 
GeoGebra is software that combines geometry, algebra and calculus for mathematics education in schools and universities. It is available free of charge for non-commercial users.

 License: open source under GPL license (free of charge)
 Languages: 55
 Geometry: points, lines, all conic sections, vectors, parametric curves, locus lines
 Algebra: direct input of inequalities, implicit polynomials, linear and quadratic equations; calculations with numbers, points and vectors
 Calculus: direct input of functions (including piecewise-defined); intersections and roots of functions; symbolic derivatives and integrals (built-in CAS); sliders as parameters
 Parametric Graphs: Yes
 Implicit Polynomials: Yes
 Web Export: all constructions exportable as web pages as a Java applet
 Macros: usable both as tools with the mouse and as commands in the input field
 Animation: Yes
 Spreadsheet: Yes, the cells can contain any GeoGebra object (numbers, points, functions etc.)
 Dynamic text: Yes (including LaTeX)
 Platforms: Mac OS, Unix/Linux, Windows (any platform that supports Java 1.5 or later)
 Continuity: uses a heuristic 'near-to-approach' to avoid jumping objects

GeoKone.NET 

GeoKone.NET is an interactive recursive natural geometry (or "sacred geometry") generator that runs in a web browser.  GeoKone allows the user to create geometric figures using naturalistic rules of recursive copying, such as the Golden ratio.

Geolog 
Geolog is a logic programming language for finitary geometric logic.

Geometry Expressions 
Geometry Expressions Does symbolic geometry. It uses real symbolic inputs and returns real and symbolic outputs. It emphasises use with a Computer Algebra System (CAS), as well as exporting and sharing via interactive HTML5, Lua, and OS X dashboard widget apps.

The Geometer's Sketchpad 

The Geometer's Sketchpad (GSP)

 Deterministic
 Languages: English, Spanish, Danish, Russian, Korean, Thai, Traditional and Simplified Chinese, French, Lithuanian (current version); others (older versions)
 Macros: Yes ("custom tools" and "scripts")
 Java-applet: Yes
 Animation: Yes
 Locus: Yes, including point on locus
 Assignments: No
 Measurement/Calculations: Yes
 Platform: Windows, Mac OS, TI-92+, works under Wine
 Proofs: No

The Geometric Supposer 

The Geometric Supposer

Géoplan-Géospace

Geonext 
Geonext was developed by the University of Bayreuth until 2007 and is completely implemented in Java. Its final version was 1.74.

GeoProof 

GeoProof is a free GPL dynamic geometry software, written in OCaml.

GEUP 

GEUP is a more calculus-oriented analog of The Geometer's Sketchpad.

Deterministic
Languages: English, French, German, Italian, Portuguese, Spanish
Macros: Yes
Java-applet: No
 Animation: Yes
 Locus: Yes, including point on locus
 Assignments: No
 Measurement/Calculations: Yes
 Platform: Windows
 Proofs: No

GRACE 
GRACE (The Graphical Ruler And Compass Editor) is an analog of The Geometer's Sketchpad (GSP), written in Java.

Jeometry 

Jeometry is a dynamic geometry applet.

Kig 

Kig is a free (GPL) analog of The Geometer's Sketchpad (GSP) for KDE, but more calculus-oriented.  It is a part of the KDE Edutainment Project.

KmPlot 

KmPlot  is a mathematical function plotter released under the free GPL license.  Includes a powerful parser and precision printing in correct scale. Simultaneously plot multiple functions and combine function terms to build new functions. Supports functions with parameters and functions in polar coordinates. Several grid modes are available. Features include:
 powerful mathematical parser
 precise metric printing
 different plot types (functions, parametric, polar)
 highly configurable visual settings (plot line, axes, grid)
 export to bitmap format (BMP and PNG) and to Scalable Vector Graphics (SVG)
 save/load complete session in readable XML format
 trace mode: cross-hair following plot, coordinates shown in the status bar
 zooming support
 ability to draw the 1st and 2nd derivative and the integral of a plot function
 support user-defined constants and parameter values
 various tools for plot functions: find minimum/maximum point, get y-value and draw the area between the function and the y-axis

KSEG
KSEG is a free (GPL) analog of The Geometer's Sketchpad (GSP) with some unique features. This software can handle heavy, complex constructions in Euclidean geometry.

Deterministic
Languages: Dutch, English, French, Chinese, German, Hungarian, Italian, Japanese, Norwegian Bokmål, Portuguese, Russian, Spanish, Turkish, Welsh
Macros: Yes. Editable and with support for recursion
Java-applet: No
 Animation: No
 Locus: Yes, but no direct way to place a point on a locus.
 Assignments: No
 Measurement/Calculations: Yes (the calculator is a bit strange)
 Platform: Unix/Linux, Windows, Mac OS (any platform that supports Qt)
 Proofs: No
 Extra: Editable

Live Geometry 

Live Geometry  is a free CodePlex project that lets you create interactive ruler and compass constructions and experiment with them.  It is written in Silverlight 4 and C# 4.0 (Visual Studio 2010).  The core engine is a flexible and extensible framework that allows easy addition of new figure types and features. The project has two front-ends: WPF and Silverlight, which both share the common DynamicGeometry library.

TracenPoche 

TracenPoche  is a completely Adobe Flash program. It is available in English, Spanish, and French.

3D programs

Cabri 3D 
Cabri Geometry

Archimedes Geo3D
Archimedes Geo3D

Euler 3D
Euler (software)

Euler 3D is a program that allows you to create and manipulate your own polyhedrons. It has a number of facilities: transformations, animations, creating duals, import/export VRML, etc.

Free registration required.

GeoGebra
GeoGebra, includes a 3D mode since version 5.0

Geomview
Geomview

Continuity versus determinism

All these programs can be divided into two category: deterministic and continuous.
GeoGebra can be deterministic or continuous (one can change it in preferences).

All constructions in the deterministic programs (GSP, Cabri, Kseg and most of others) are completely determined by the given points but the result of some constructions can jump or behave unexpectedly when a given point is moved.

On the contrary, some constructions in continuous programs (so far only Cinderella and GeoGebra), depend on the number of hidden parameters and in such a way that moving a given point produces a continuous motion of the construction, as a result, if the point is moved back to the original position the result of construction might be different.

Here is a test to check whether a particular program is continuous:

Construct the orthocenter of triangle and three midpoints (say A', B' C'  ) between vertices and orthocenter.

Construct a circumcircle of A'B'C' .

This is the nine-point circle, it intersects each side of the original triangle at two points: the base of altitude and midpoint. Construct an intersection of one side with the circle at midpoint now move opposite vertex of the original triangle, if the constructed point does not move when base of altitude moves through it that probably means that your program is continuous.

Although it is possible to make a deterministic program which behaves continuously in this and similar simple examples, in general it can be proved that no program can be continuous and deterministic at the same time.

See also
 Mathematical software
 Constructive solid geometry
 Lénárt sphere

References

External links
 A Comparison of Geometry Software for the Classroom

Lists of software
Geometry education